Ovchepoltsi is a village in Pazardzhik Municipality, Pazardzhik Province, southern Bulgaria.  it has 1,101 inhabitants. The village is located in a hilly area, known as Ovchite Halmove (Sheep Hills). As this name suggests, sheep breeding is the main occupation. The village is also a stop at the Plovdiv-Panagyurishte railway.

There is a military airport situated to the south of the village.

References

Villages in Pazardzhik Province